Jennifer Milan (born 22 September 1987 in Milan, Italy) is an Italian R&B and Pop singer.

Career
In 2008 Jennifer took part at the Italian talent show Amici di Maria De Filippi. She has been compared to Beyoncé and Joss Stone.

On 11 June 2009 was released in the United States and in Europe her first single "I Go To Go", written by Wayne Hector. The single "Watch Out" was included on the soundtrack of the movie Genitori & Figli-Agitare Bene Prima Dell'Uso, by Giovanni Veronesi, released at the cinema on 26 February 2010. On 2 March 2010 her first album, 22, was released.  From the album was also released "Sos" as third single along with a videoclip.
In 2011 she started working on a new album in Los Angeles. On 8 August 2013 she released a new single "Dance Floor"

Discography

Albums
2010 – 22

Singles
2009 – Beside Me (#15 Italian FIMI Singles Chart)
2009 – I Got To Go
2010 – Watch Out (feat. Pras Michel)
2010 – SoS
2013 – Dance Floor

Videography
2009 – I Go To Go
2010 – SoS

References

1987 births
Living people
English-language singers from Italy
Singers from Milan
Italian rhythm and blues singers
21st-century Italian singers
21st-century Italian women singers